Everything's Beautiful is an album by American musician Robert Glasper based on Miles Davis' samples. It was released on May 27, 2016 through Blue Note/Legacy/Columbia Records. Recording sessions took place at Anu It! Studio, Brooklyn Recording and the Thingamajig Lab 2 in New York, Klearlight Studios and Precious House Studios in Dallas, the Peanut Gallery and Brightlady Studios in Raleigh, Willow Grove Studios in Australia, State Of The Ark in London, King Creative Studios and Wonderland Studios in Los Angeles, with additional recording at Westlake Recording Studios. Production was handled by 9th Wonder, Anu~Sun, Black Milk, DJ Spinna, Erykah Badu, Georgia Anne Muldrow, Hiatus Kaiyote, Jewels, Paris Strother, Rashad Smith, Robert Glasper, and Steve Berkowitz, who also served as executive producer with Adam Block, Erin Davis, Nicole Hegeman and Vince Wilburn. It features guest appearances from Bilal, Erykah Badu, Georgia Anne Muldrow, Hiatus Kaiyote, Illa J, Laura Mvula, Ledisi, Phonte, Stevie Wonder and We Are King, as well as contributions from bassists Derrick Hodge, Braylon Lacy and Burniss Travis, guitarists Danny Leznoff, Kyle Bolden and John Scofield, saxophonist Lakecia Benjamin, and keyboardist Joe Zawinul among others.

In the United States, the album peaked at number 152 on the Billboard 200, at number-one on both the Top Contemporary Jazz Albums and Jazz Albums, at number five on the Top R&B Albums, at number ten on the Top R&B/Hip-Hop Albums, and at number seventeen on the Tastemakers. It also reached #50 in Switzerland, #85 in the Netherlands, #94 in Germany, #178 in France, and #44 and #118 in Flanders and Wallonia (Belgium) respectively.

Critical reception 

Everything's Beautiful was met with generally favorable reviews from music critics. At Metacritic, which assigns a normalized rating out of 100 to reviews from mainstream publications, the album received an average score of 73 based on eleven reviews.

Matt Bauer of Exclaim! gave the album 9 out of 10 stating: "Everything's Beautiful, indeed". Emmanuel Elone of PopMatters found the album "is not the real tribute; it's Glasper's determination to evolve the genre that is, and I don't think Miles Davis would have it any other way". Andy Gill of The Independent wrote: "Erykah Badu lends a childlike charm to the sunburnt fizz of Glasper's bossa nova version of "Maiysha (So Long)", with Miles's trumpet shining through towards the end". Seth Colter Walls of Pitchfork wrote: "a trio of cuts toward the middle of Everything's Beautiful suffers from feeling less robustly reimagined than the rest of the set--placing a slight drag on momentum". AllMusic's Andy Kellman wrote: "considering the disparate source material and the quantity of vocalists, instrumentalists, and producers involved, it's remarkable how smoothly the album flows from one track to the next. Unsurprisingly, it's most appealing to fans of Glasper and those he involved". Greg Tate of Rolling Stone stated: "Glasper and his confreres have used Davis' inspiration to craft a moving and misterioso assemblage that, true-to-the-living Davis, refuses any scent of museum entombment".

In mixed reviews, The Wire critic suggested: "Glasper is undoubtedly a class act, but the lacks the wildness a Madlib or a Flying Lotus might have brought to this project". Mojo reviewer clared: "smooth soul or hip hop tropes being largely the order of the day here". Siddhartha Mitter of The Boston Globe wrote: "the middle of the album is a problem, especially the Hiatus Kaiyote number, "Little Church", a strange, bloodless clunker that drags down the Mvula ("Silence Is the Way") and KING ("Song for Selim") features that follow. The Badu track, the electro-bossa nova "Maiysha (So Long)", is fine but familiar. Miles Davis concept aside, Glasper's still in Black Radio mode. It works, but it needs a little dirt, and probably a new challenge". Mark Streeter of Now wrote: "in a way, this could be Glasper's Black Radio Volume 3: The Davis Edition. However, positioning the album as a tribute runs counter to his forward-looking use of the material".

Track listing 

 Sample credits

 Track 1 contains samples of Miles Davis' voice from the Jack Johnson, Nefertiti and In a Silent Way sessions and Joe Zawinul's piano from the In a Silent Way sessions
 Track 2 contains a sample of "The Ghetto Walk" written by Miles Davis, as performed by Miles Davis
 Track 4 contains a sample of "Maiysha" written by Miles Davis, as performed by Miles Davis
 Track 5 contains a sample of "Blue in Green" written by Miles Davis, as performed by Miles Davis
 Track 7 contains a sample of "In a Silent Way" written by Josef Zawinul, as performed by Miles Davis
 Track 8 contains a sample of "Selim" written by Miles Davis, as performed by Miles Davis
 Track 10 contains a sample of music and Miles Davis talking from Jack Johnson sessions
 Track 11 contains a sample of "Right Off" written by Miles Davis, as performed by Miles Davis, and an interpolation of "Nefertiti" written by Wayne Shorter

Personnel 

 Robert Glasper – keyboards (tracks 2–4), percussion (track 4), piano (tracks 7, 9), producer (tracks 1–4, 7, 10), liner notes
 Bilal Oliver – vocals (track 2)
 John Derek "Illa J" Yancey – vocals (track 3)
 Erica "Erykah Badu" Wright – vocals, percussion & producer (track 4)
 Phonte Coleman – vocals & recording (track 5)
 Bianca Rodriguez – additional backing vocals & recording (track 5)
 Naomi "Nai Palm" Saalfield – vocals (track 6)
 Laura "Mvula" Douglas – vocals (track 7)
 Amber Strother – vocals (track 8)
 Anita Bias – vocals (track 8)
 Paris Strother – vocals, producer, recording & mixing (track 8)
 Georgia Anne Muldrow – vocals, producer, recording & mixing (track 9)
 Ledisi Anibade Young – vocals (track 10)
 Christopher "Chris Rob" Robinson – vocals, piano, Fender Rhodes, synthesizer & co-producer (track 11)
 Derrick Hodge – bass (tracks 1–3)
 Josef Erich "Joe" Zawinul – piano (track 1)
 Danny Leznoff – guitar (track 3)
 Rashad "Ringo" Smith – percussion (track 4), producer (tracks: 3, 4)
 Braylon Lacy – bass (track 4)
 Burniss Travis – bass (tracks: 5, 10)
 Kyle Bolden – guitar (track 8)
 John Scofield – guitar (track 10)
 Lakecia Benjamin – alto and tenor saxophone (track 11)
 Vincent "DJ Spinna" Williams – drum programming, percussion & producer (track 11)
 Stevland Hardaway "Stevie Wonder" Morris – harmonica (track 11)
 Brandee Younger – harp (track 11)
 Curtis "Jewels" Jews – producer (tracks: 1, 2, 7)
 Anu~Sun – producer (track 10), mixing (tracks: 1-3, 10), recording (tracks: 2, 10)
 Patrick "9th Wonder" Douthit – producer & recording (track 5)
 Hiatus Kaiyote – producer & engineering (track 6)
 Steve Berkowitz – producer (track 10), executive producer
 Curtis "Black Milk" Cross – producer (track 10)
 James Benjamin – engineering (track 3)
 Jimi Bowman – recording (track 4)
 Chris Tabron – mixing (tracks: 4, 11)
 Caleb Laven – engineering mix assistant (tracks: 4, 11)
 Jules – recording & mixing (track 7)
 Andy Taub – recording (track 10)
 Keith "Qmillion" Lewis – additional recording (track 10)
 Cristian F. Perez – Pro Tools engineering (track 11)
 Femi Jiya – recording (track 11)
 Vincent Wilburn, Jr. – executive producer
 Adam Block – executive producer
 Erin Davis – executive producer
 Nicole Hegeman – executive producer
 Frank Harkins – art direction
 Alice Butts – design
 Francine Turk – design
 Jim Lane – product management and direction
 Tara Master – project management and direction

Charts

References

External links 
 

2016 albums
Miles Davis
Robert Glasper albums
Columbia Records albums
Blue Note Records albums
Legacy Recordings albums
Albums produced by DJ Spinna
Albums produced by 9th Wonder
Albums produced by Black Milk
Albums produced by Rashad Smith